Admiral Sir Arthur Francis Eric Palliser,  (20 July 1890 – 22 February 1956) was a prominent Royal Navy officer during the Second World War.

Early life and career
Palliser was born in Richmond, Surrey, the son of Arthur Palliser and Hester Brenda Boord. He was educated at Bradfield College, joined the Royal Navy (RN) as a naval cadet in 1905 and was trained at the Royal Naval College, Dartmouth and Royal Naval College, Greenwich. By 1911, he had achieved the rank of lieutenant.

Following service during the First World War, Palliser was awarded the Distinguished Service Cross and Croix de Guerre avec Palme in 1917. He was promoted to lieutenant commander in 1919. In 1921, Palliser married Margaret Eva King Salter, with whom he had a son and a daughter. From 1923 to 1925 he attended HMS Excellent, a gunnery school at Portsmouth. In 1927–28, Palliser attended a staff course at the Royal Naval Staff College, Greenwich. During 1930–32, he achieved the rank of captain and spent brief periods as fleet gunnery officer, Mediterranean, executive officer of the battlecruiser HMS Tiger, with the Atlantic Fleet and as commander of the destroyer HMS Blanche, in the Mediterranean.

During 1934–35, he attended the Royal Naval War College at Greenwich, followed by an appointment as chief of staff to the Commander-in-Chief, China (1936–38). Palliser returned to the gunnery school at Excellent, as commander, in 1938–40.

Second World War
Palliser commanded the battleship HMS Malaya in 1940–41 and was an Aide de Camp to King George VI during the same period.

In 1941, he was appointed Chief of Staff to the Commander-in-Chief of the British Eastern Fleet, Admiral Sir Thomas Phillips. During early 1942, as a rear admiral, Palliser became deputy commander of Naval Forces, in the American-British-Dutch-Australian Command (ABDACOM) – a short-lived joint command for Allied forces in South East Asia and the South West Pacific – under the US Admiral Thomas C. Hart and the Dutch admiral Conrad Helfrich. Later that year, he was appointed Flag Officer and Fortress Commander at Trincomalee and also served in a staff position with the Royal Indian Navy at New Delhi. On 2 February 1943 he was Mentioned in Despatches for "good services in the a term used in British circles for ABDACOM).

During 1943, he returned to the UK to command the 1st Cruiser Squadron. In 1944, Palliser was made Fourth Sea Lord and Chief of Supplies and Transport, a position he held until 1946. From 1946 he held the position of Commander-in-Chief, East Indies Station. Palliser was made Knight Commander of the Bath in 1945, and was made a full admiral in 1947.

Palliser retired in 1948 and died on 22 February 1956 in Kensington, London.

Notes

References

 
 

|-

1890 births
1956 deaths
Graduates of the Royal Naval College, Greenwich
Graduates of Britannia Royal Naval College
Lords of the Admiralty
Knights Commander of the Order of the Bath
Royal Navy admirals of World War II
Royal Navy officers of World War I
People from Richmond, London
Admiralty personnel of World War II
Military personnel from Surrey